Mohammadi, is a city in and the capital of Central District, in Saravan County, Sistan and Baluchestan Province, Iran. At the 2016 census, its population was 5,606, in 1,117 families.

People
Most people in Mohammadi are Baloch and most people speak the Balochi language.

References

Cities in Sistan and Baluchestan Province